A New Flame is the third album by British pop and soul group Simply Red, released in February 1989. It was a huge success worldwide, becoming the band's first UK number one album and certified 7× Platinum by the BPI for sales of 2,100,000 copies in the UK alone. The album was also certified Gold in the US by the RIAA.

Track listing
Side one

Side two

2008 Collector’s Edition bonus tracks
Disc one

Disc two (DVD)
'Let Me Take You Home'— Live at Manchester 1990

Personnel 
Simply Red
 Mick Hucknall – lead vocals (all vocals on "Enough")
 Fritz McIntyre – keyboards, backing vocals
 Tim Kellett – keyboards, trumpet, live backing vocals
 Heitor TP – guitars 
 Tony Bowers – bass 
 Chris Joyce – drums
 Ian Kirkham – saxophones

Guest musicians
 Erik Hanson – synthesizer programming
 Larry Williams – synthesizer programming
 Lenny Castro – percussion
 Stephanie Spruell – backing vocals

Production 
 Producer – Stewart Levine
 Engineered and Mixed by Darren Klein 
 Assistant Engineers – Clark Germain and Karl Lever
 Recorded at AIR Studios (Montserrat, West Indies).
 Mixed at Ocean Way Recording (Los Angeles, CA).
 Mastered by Bernie Grundman at Bernie Grundman Mastering (Hollywood, CA).
 Design – Peter Barrett and Andrew Biscomb
 Cover Photograph – Juergen Teller
 Inner Sleeve Photos – Shelia Rock and Juergen Teller

Charts

Weekly charts

Year-end charts

Decade-end charts

Certifications

References

1989 albums
Simply Red albums
Albums produced by Stewart Levine
Elektra Records albums
Albums recorded at AIR Studios